The Calhoun County Courthouse is a historic county courthouse in Anniston, Alabama. It was designed by Atlanta architect J. W. Golucke and built in 1900, when the county seat of Calhoun County was moved from Jacksonville. It is one of the earliest Neoclassical courthouses in Alabama.  An annex with a jail was added on the north side of the building in 1924.  The courthouse was rebuilt after a 1931 fire, albeit with a slightly different clock tower.  A southeastern annex was built in 1963. The building was listed on the National Register of Historic Places in 1985.

See also
List of county courthouses in Alabama

References

Buildings and structures in Anniston, Alabama
Courthouses on the National Register of Historic Places in Alabama
County courthouses in Alabama
Government buildings completed in 1900
Neoclassical architecture in Alabama
National Register of Historic Places in Calhoun County, Alabama
1900 establishments in Alabama